Break the Spell Tour was the second headlining tour from record breaking American rock band Daughtry. The first leg of the tour was announced on January 16, 2012. The tour began on March 20, 2012, in Buffalo, New York and finished on October 19, 2012, in Dubai. It was in support of third studio album Break the Spell and grossed $6.3 million.

Opening acts
Mike Sanchez
SafetySuit

Set list
"Renegade"
"Break the Spell"
"Feels Like Tonight"
"Crawling Back to You"
"Losing My Mind"
"Outta My Head"
"Crazy"
"Start of Something Good"
"What About Now"
"Home"
"Rescue Me"
"Spaceship"
"Louder Than Ever"
"Over You"
"No Surprise"
"Runnin' Down A Dream" 
"September"
Encore
"Rebel Yell" 
"It's Not Over"

Tour dates

Box office score date

Personnel
Band
Chris Daughtry – lead vocals, guitar
Josh Steely – lead guitar
Brian Craddock – rhythm guitar, backing vocals
Josh Paul – bass
Robin Diaz – drums

Touring members
Elvio Fernandes – keyboards, backing vocals

References

2012 concert tours
Daughtry (band) concert tours